The Society for Cryobiology is an international scientific society that was founded in 1964. Its objectives are to promote research in low temperature biology, to improve scientific understanding in this field, and to disseminate and aid in the application of this knowledge. The Society also publishes a journal called Cryobiology.

References

External links
Society for Cryobiology official site

Cryobiology